Lorenzo Ramírez (born June 11, 1985) is a former Mexican professional footballer who plays for Murciélagos  of Ascenso MX on loan from Sinaloa.

External links

Liga MX players
Living people
Dorados de Sinaloa footballers
1985 births
Sportspeople from Culiacán
Footballers from Sinaloa
Mexican footballers
Association football midfielders